Lena Göppel (born 11 August 2001) is a Liechtensteiner footballer who plays as a midfielder for the Louisiana-Monroe Warhawks and the Liechtenstein national football team.

Career statistics

International

International goals

Personal life
She is the younger sister of Liechtenstein men's international defender Maximilian Göppel.

References

External links
 Louisiana-Monroe Warhawks bio

2001 births
Living people
Women's association football midfielders
Liechtenstein women's footballers
Liechtenstein women's international footballers
Liechtenstein expatriate women's footballers
Liechtenstein expatriate sportspeople in the United States
Expatriate women's soccer players in the United States
Louisiana–Monroe Warhawks women's soccer players